The flag of the Udmurt Autonomous Soviet Socialist Republic was adopted in 1954 by the government of the Udmurt Autonomous Soviet Socialist Republic. The flag is identical to the flag of the Russian Soviet Federative Socialist Republic.

History

First version 
The first flag of the Udmurt ASSR was described in the first Constitution of the Udmurt ASSR, which was adopted by the Central Executive Committee of the Udmurt ASSR on 14 March 1937, at the 2nd Extraordinary Congress of Soviets of the Udmurt ASSR. The flag is described in Article 116 of the constitution :

Second version 

On March 29, 1954, by the decision of the Presidium of the Supreme Council of the Udmurt ASSR, a new state flag of the Udmurt ASSR was adopted, which was approved by the Law of the Udmurt ASSR of July 8, 1954. On April 6, 1955, Article 110 of the Constitution of the Udmurt ASSR was amended:

The decree on the state flag of the Udmurt ASSR was approved by the Decree of the Presidium of the Supreme Soviet of the Udmurt ASSR on March 10, 1956.

Revision 
On May 31, 1978, the extraordinary 9th session of the Supreme Soviet of the Udmurt ASSR adopted the new constitution of the Udmurt ASSR. The article 158 of the constitution contains the design of the flag:

Gallery

References

Citations

Bibliography 

Udmurt Autonomous Soviet Socialist Republic
1937 establishments in the Soviet Union
1993 disestablishments in Russia